Eschrichtius is a genus of baleen whale containing two species: the gray whale (E. robustus) and the extinct Akishima whale (E. akishimaensis).

References

Cetacean genera
Mammal genera with one living species
Baleen whales
Taxa named by John Edward Gray